Kalomoira Kontomichi (born 3 August 1984) is a Greek football player.

Kontomichi plays her club football for Kallithea in the Greek Women's Alpha Ethniki.

Kontomichi appeared seven times for the Greece women's national football team in the 2007 FIFA Women's World Cup qualifying rounds. She has also played for the team in the 2011 FIFA Women's World Cup qualifying rounds, scoring a hat-trick in a 5–0 home victory over Georgia on 26 November 2009.

References

1984 births
Living people
Women's association football forwards
Greek women's footballers
Greece women's international footballers